Macrodactylomyia is a genus of flies in the family Dolichopodidae. It is known from Brazil, and contains only one species, Macrodactylomyia magnicauda. The generic name is a combination of the Greek word 'macros' (meaning 'large') and Dactylomyia. The specific name is a combination of the Latin words 'magnus' (meaning 'large') and 'cauda' (meaning 'tail').

References

Dolichopodidae genera
Neurigoninae
Diptera of South America
Monotypic Diptera genera
Insects of Brazil
Endemic fauna of Brazil